Christian Peyron (born 20 March 1952 – 1 April 2007) was a French professional footballer who played as a goalkeeper. He notably played 57 Division 1 matches for Nice.

Honours 
Nice

 Coupe de France runner-up: 1977–78

References 

1952 births
2007 deaths
Sportspeople from Aix-en-Provence
French footballers
Association football goalkeepers

Pays d'Aix FC players
OGC Nice players
Ligue 2 players
Ligue 1 players
French Division 3 (1971–1993) players
Footballers from Provence-Alpes-Côte d'Azur